Swagger is the second studio album by Canadian Inuk rock singer Lucie Idlout. It was released on February 19, 2009 by Sun Rev. Records.

Awards
The album received a Juno Award nomination for Aboriginal Recording of the Year in 2010, but lost to Digging Roots' We Are...

The album also received six nominations at the Aboriginal Peoples Choice Music Awards and seven nominations at the Canadian Aboriginal Music Awards, and won the award for Best Rock Album at the CAMAs.

Track listing

References

2009 albums
Lucie Idlout albums